Crenicichla frenata is a species of cichlid native to South America. It is found in Trinidad and northeastern Venezuela.

References

Kullander, S.O., 2003. Cichlidae (Cichlids). p. 605-654. In R.E. Reis, S.O. Kullander and C.J. Ferraris, Jr. (eds.) Checklist of the Freshwater Fishes of South and Central America. Porto Alegre: EDIPUCRS, Brasil. 

frenata
Fish of Venezuela
Taxa named by Theodore Gill 
Fish described in 1858